The Unity Party was a small multiculturist party in Australia, formed in 1997 and primarily active in the state of New South Wales. It was formed with the aim of opposing the rise of the controversial anti-immigration politician Pauline Hanson. Although initially billed as a party to unite Australians of all ethnicities against racism, Unity failed to draw significant support outside Australia's East Asian ethnic communities. After the demise of Pauline Hanson as a political force (prior to her return to politics in the late 2010s), Unity shifted focus onto ethnic community affairs at a local government level.

History

Formation
Unity attracted much attention when it was founded in 1997, with Peter Wong, Mary Kalantzis, Bill Cope and Jason Yat-Sen Li among those involved in its creation.

The party ran candidates in almost every House of Representatives seat at the 1998 election. While they had hopes of winning a Senate seat in New South Wales with Jason Li, he fell well short. However, the party outpolled the Australian Democrats and Australian Greens in some House of Representatives seats. In the NSW Federal seat of Fowler, investment banker Andrew Su outpolled both the Democrats and One Nation. Subsequently, in the 1999 NSW State Election, Su went on to poll more than the Liberals, Greens and Democrats in the safe Labor seat of Cabramatta.

The Unity Party was formally registered by the Australian Electoral Commission on 25 August 1998 under the name "Unity – Say No to Hanson".

Decline
As the Hanson movement began to disintegrate, it also negated Unity's main platform, and the party soon fell into internal tensions. The party's founder, Dr. Peter Wong, won a seat in the New South Wales Legislative Council with just 1% of the vote. This came against the backdrop of a series of resignations, including that of Li. Wong soon stepped down as leader in favour of a white Australian in an attempt to broaden the party's base.

Unity's activities largely died down throughout 2000 and Wong acted as a virtual independent in the Legislative Council. However, with the re-emergence of Hanson's One Nation party at the 2001 Western Australian state election, the party again came together and put together a large slate of candidates for the federal election that year. Despite having several prominent candidates (such as former Melbourne City Council member Wellington Lee in Victoria), they fell even further short of winning a seat in either house of federal parliament.

After their failure to break into federal parliament in 2001, Unity largely shifted its attentions to local government, running a number of candidates for local councils in largely non-white areas, primarily in suburban Sydney. It was deregistered by the AEC on 13 November 2003 for failing to have at least 500 members as required by electoral law. The party did not run any candidates in the 2004 federal election.

Wong continued to represent Unity in the NSW Parliament, until the expiry of his term in March 2007. At the March 2007 NSW state election, lead Unity Upper House candidate, Le Lam, won 1.2% of the vote, which was insufficient to gain election. Consequently, Unity no longer holds seats in any Australian parliament.

The party did not contest the 2011 NSW state election although Pauline Hanson did.

The party contested one New South Wales Legislative Assembly seat (Kogarah) in the 2015 state election, receiving 7.9% of the vote in that seat.

Past presidents
 Peter Wong, 1997–1999, 2007–2009
 Ernest Wong

Prominent past and present members
 Randa Abdel-Fattah, writer
 Cr. Jack Au, Deputy Mayor of Auburn 
 Cr. Sylvia Chao, Willoughby City Councillor
 Silma Ihram, Muslim educationist
 Sarah Kemp, actress
 Cr. Le Lam, former Mayor of Auburn 
 Wellington Lee, former Deputy Lord Mayor of Melbourne
 Cr. Joshua Nam, Canterbury City Councillor
 Cr. Thang Ngo, former Fairfield City Councillor 
 Andrew Su, ex investment banker and Chief Executive Officer, Compass Global Markets
 Cr. Annie Tang, Deputy Mayor of Kogarah 
 Cr. Alfred Tsang, former Mayor of Strathfield
 Cr. Ernest Wong, former Mayor of Burwood; appointed to the New South Wales Legislative Council in 2013, representing Labor
 Dr Peter Wong, member of the New South Wales Legislative Council (1999–2007) representing the Unity Party

Youth faction
Unity also has a youth division, called Young Unity.

See also
Multicultural Progress Party

References

External links
 Unity Party Australia official website
 Unity Party WA 
 Young Unity

Anti-racism in Australia
Multiculturalism in Australia
Political parties established in 1997
Defunct political parties in Australia